The 1974 United States Senate election in California was held on November 5, 1974. Incumbent Democrat Alan Cranston defeated Republican nominee H. L. Richardson with 60.52% of the vote.

Primary elections
Primary elections were held on June 4, 1974.

Democratic primary

Candidates
Alan Cranston, incumbent United States Senator
Howard L. Gifford
Frank Kacsinta

Results

Republican primary

Candidates
H. L. Richardson, State Senator
Earl W. Brian
James E. Johnson
William H. Reinholz
Thomas A. Malatesta

Results

General election

Candidates
Major party candidates
Alan Cranston, Democratic
H. L. Richardson, Republican

Other candidates
Jacie McCoy, American Independent
Gayle Justice, Peace and Freedom

Results

References

1974
California
United States Senate